First-seeded Althea Gibson defeated second-seeded Louise Brough 6–3, 6–2 in the final to win the women's singles tennis title at the 1957 U.S. National Championships.

Seeds 
The seeded players are listed below. Althea Gibson is the champion; others show in brackets the round in which they were eliminated.

  Althea Gibson (champion)
  Louise Brough (finalist)
  Dorothy Knode (semifinals)
  Shirley Bloomer (quarterfinals)
  Darlene Hard (semifinals)
  Christine Truman (third round)
  Ann Haydon (quarterfinals)
  Mary Hawton (quarterfinals)

Draw

Key
 Q = Qualifier
 WC = Wild card
 LL = Lucky loser
 r = Retired

Final eight

References 

1957
1957 in women's tennis
1957 in American women's sports
Women's Singles